Cedrick Leterris Holt (born December 30, 1983 in Wadesboro, North Carolina) is a former American football cornerback.  He was originally signed by the Tennessee Titans as an undrafted free agent in 2007.  He played college football at the University of North Carolina. He graduated from Anson High School in 2002.

External links
Indianapolis Colts bio
North Carolina Tar Heels bio
Washington Redskins bio

1983 births
Living people
People from Wadesboro, North Carolina
African-American players of American football
American football cornerbacks
North Carolina Tar Heels football players
Tennessee Titans players
Indianapolis Colts players
Washington Redskins players
21st-century African-American sportspeople
20th-century African-American people